Ahsan Dilhara (born 26 June 2000) is a Sri Lankan cricketer. He made his List A debut on 19 December 2019, for Panadura Sports Club in the 2019–20 Invitation Limited Over Tournament. He made his first-class debut for Panadura Sports Club in Tier B of the 2019–20 Premier League Tournament on 6 March 2020. He made his Twenty20 debut on 5 March 2021, for Panadura Sports Club in the 2020–21 SLC Twenty20 Tournament.

References

External links
 

2001 births
Living people
Sri Lankan cricketers
Panadura Sports Club cricketers